Baliram Kashyap (11 March 1936 – 10 March 2011) was an Indian politician. He was a member of the 12th, 13th, 14th, and 15th Lok Sabhas of India.  He represented the Bastar constituency of Chhattisgarh and was a member of the Bharatiya Janata Party (BJP) political party. Kashyap died on 10 March 2011, only one day before his 75th birthday. He is known as Balasaheb Thackeray of Bastar.

Early life and education

Baliram Kashyap was born on 11 March 1936 at Bhanpuri, Distt. Bastar (Chhattisgarh). His father's name was Shri Mahadev Kashyap and mother's name was Smt. Radhibai Kashyap. He married Smt. Manaki Kashyap on 10 Mar 1958. He had 4 sons and 3 daughters. He was educated at Anglo-Indian School Kondagaon, Bastar, Madhya Pradesh but did not completed his matriculation. By profession he was an agriculturist.

Positions held

1972–92	Member, Madhya Pradesh Legislative Assembly
1977–78	Minister of State, Public Works Department, Government of Madhya Pradesh
1978–80 & 1989–92	Cabinet Minister, Tribal Welfare, Government of Madhya Pradesh
1998–99	Elected to 12th Lok Sabha
Whip, B.J.P. Parliamentary Party, Lok Sabha
Member, Committee on Agriculture
1999	Re-elected to 13th Lok Sabha (2nd term)
1999–2000	
Member, Consultative Committee, Ministry of Food and Consumer Affairs
Member, Committee on Human Resource Development
2000–2004	Member, Consultative Committee, Ministry of Commerce and Industry
2004	Re-elected to 14th Lok Sabha (3rd term)
2004–2006	Member, Committee on Petitions
2004–2009	Member, Committee on Food, Consumer Affairs and Public Distribution
2009	Re-elected to 15th Lok Sabha (4th term)
31 Aug 2009	Member, Committee on Social Justice and Empowerment

References 
Official Bio Profile at Parliament of India Website

1936 births
2011 deaths
Bharatiya Janata Party politicians from Chhattisgarh
India MPs 1998–1999
India MPs 1999–2004
India MPs 2004–2009
Lok Sabha members from Chhattisgarh
India MPs 2009–2014
State cabinet ministers of Madhya Pradesh
Madhya Pradesh MLAs 1972–1977
People from Bastar district
Bharatiya Jana Sangh politicians